Santaniello is a surname of Italian origin. People with the surname include:

Andrew J. Santaniello Jr. (1926–1986), member of the Connecticut Senate
Angelo G. Santaniello (1924–2015), Justice of the Connecticut Supreme Court
Emanuele Santaniello (born 1990), Italian professional footballer